Amy Turner (born 4 July 1991) is an English footballer who plays as a defender for Tottenham Hotspur.  She has been capped four times for the England national team.

Turner previously played for Manchester United, Liverpool, Lincoln Ladies, Notts County, Sheffield, Leeds United, Doncaster Rovers Belles and Orlando Pride.

Club career

Early career
A product of Sheffield Wednesday and Sheffield United's girls' teams, Turner made her FA Women's Premier League debut for Doncaster Rovers Belles at the age of 16. In 2009, she left to attend Hofstra University and play National Collegiate Athletic Association (NCAA) college soccer. She played two seasons at centre-back for Hofstra Pride, making 41 appearances and scoring 4 goals. As a rookie she was named to the Colonial Athletic Association all-rookie team.

She returned to Doncaster for the inaugural 2011 FA WSL season, but was released after being informed she "wasn't good enough" to play at that level. Turner dropped down the leagues to rebuild her confidence, with spells at Leeds United and Sheffield, outside the FA WSL.

Notts County
Turner returned to the top level with Lincoln Ladies in 2013. Turner remained with the rebranded Notts County team for its inaugural season in 2014. She was rewarded with a new two-year contract in January 2015, and was seen as an important member of the team. She was named on the shortlist for the PFA Women's Young Player of the Year in 2015, but lost out to Leah Williamson. In late 2016, Turner suffered a knee injury that ruled her out for 15 months. In April 2017, Notts County folded two days before the start of the Spring Series, leaving Turner without a club.

Liverpool
On 16 May 2017, it was announced that she had signed for Liverpool. In January 2018, she made her Liverpool debut as substitute against Yeovil Town, having missed over a year of football through injury.

Manchester United
On 13 July 2018, it was announced that Turner had signed with Manchester United for their inaugural season. She made her competitive debut for Manchester United in a 1–0 League Cup victory against Liverpool on 19 August and her Championship debut in a 12–0 win against Aston Villa on 9 September. She scored her first goal for the club on 28 April 2019 in a 5–0 away win against Millwall Lionesses. Ahead of the 2020–21 season, Turner signed a new one-year contract with an option for a further year.

Orlando Pride
On 25 June 2021, Turner was signed by Orlando Pride to a two-year contract with an option for an additional season using allocation money. She joined the league the same summer as her partner, Angharad James, who had signed a two-year deal with North Carolina Courage. Turner made her Orlando debut on 4 July 2021, as an 80th-minute substitute in a 2–0 defeat to James' North Carolina Courage. On 17 June 2022, it was announced Turner had had her contract bought out by the club and released.

Tottenham Hotspur
On 27 July 2022, Turner returned to her native England when she joined Tottenham Hotspur on a two-year contract with the option for a further year.

International career
Turner represented England at under-23 level. She was called up to the senior squad for the first time for the 2015 Cyprus Cup after Casey Stoney withdrew with an injury. Turner made her international debut in a 3–0 win against Australia in March 2015, coming on as a substitute for the final two minutes. She made her full debut in the team's next match against Netherlands. Turner made a further two appearances, starting and playing the full 90 minutes against Estonia in September and Bosnia and Herzegovina in November 2015 during UEFA Women's Euro 2017 qualifying as England kept a clean sheet in both victories.

Personal life
Turner's younger sister, Lucy, is also a footballer and is the captain for Barnsley.

On 23 December 2020, Turner announced her engagement to Wales international and Reading footballer Angharad James.

Career statistics

Club

International

Honours

Club
Manchester United
 FA Women's Championship: 2018–19

International
England
Cyprus Cup: 2015

References

External links

 Profile at the Manchester United F.C. website
 

Women's association football defenders
England women's international footballers
English women's footballers
Women's Super League players
Living people
Doncaster Rovers Belles L.F.C. players
Leeds United Women F.C. players
Notts County L.F.C. players
Sheffield United W.F.C. players
Sheffield F.C. Ladies players
Manchester United W.F.C. players
Orlando Pride players
Tottenham Hotspur F.C. Women players
FA Women's National League players
Expatriate women's soccer players in the United States
Hofstra Pride women's soccer players
English expatriate women's footballers
English expatriate sportspeople in the United States
1991 births
LGBT association football players
21st-century English LGBT people
National Women's Soccer League players